Mulsanteus hirtellus, is a species of click beetle found in India, Sri Lanka, Nepal and Bhutan.

References 

Elateridae
Insects of Sri Lanka
Insects described in 1863